The Jaguar I-Pace (stylised as I-PACE) is a battery-electric crossover SUV produced by Jaguar Land Rover (JLR) under their Jaguar marque. The I-Pace was announced in March 2018, European deliveries began in June 2018 and North American deliveries started in October 2018.

Development

The Jaguar I-Pace was designed by Ian Callum. The concept version of the car, described as a five-seater sports car, was unveiled by JLR at the 2016 Los Angeles Motor Show and shown on-road in London in March 2017. 

The I-Pace is built by contract manufacturer Magna Steyr in Graz, Austria, and the production version of the I-Pace was revealed in Graz on 1 March 2018.

Some of the electric drive technology has come out of the Jaguar I-Type electric Formula E racing car programme, and the concentric motors were developed by JLR engineer Dr. Alex Michaelides.

Specifications

The drag coefficient is 0.29.

The car has all-wheel drive via two motors powered by a 90kWh LG Chem lithium-ion battery with a battery management system developed by JLR. The 062mph (0100km/h) time is 4.8 seconds, and the top speed is electronically limited to 124mph (200km/h).

The battery contains 432 pouch cells. It can charge from 0 to 80 percent in 85 minutes using 50kW DC charging, or 45 minutes using a 100kW charger. Home charging with an AC wall box (7kW) achieves the same state of charge in 10 hours. Later models had 11kW AC charging, at single-phase or three-phase, depending on market.

The car comes with a smartphone app which can locate the car, report on its locking, alarming, and charging status, and start its battery preconditioning and/or cabin heating/cooling.

Awards 

The I-Pace has won 62 international awards. In March 2019, it won the European Car of the Year award, the first Jaguar to win the award. In April 2019, it became the 2019 World Car of the Year, and won Best Design and Best Green Car awards.

Safety
In December 2018, the European New Car Assessment Programme (NCAP) awarded the Jaguar I-Pace a 5-star safety rating.

Racing

Jaguar I-Pace eTrophy (Racecar) 

The Jaguar I-Pace has a race-prepped version called the I-Pace eTrophy, a development of the I-Pace by Jaguar Special Vehicle Operations.

Series 
In September 2017, Jaguar announced their single-make racing series for the I-Pace, called eTrophy, after the racecar of the same name.

On 24 August 2018, the Jaguar I-Pace set a new EV lap record at Laguna Seca Racetrack in California.

Sales

Partnership for autonomous ride service
In 2018, Waymo selected the Jaguar I-Pace for use in its autonomous ride-hailing service, placing an order for 20,000 vehicles.

Wireless charging project
In June 2020, Jaguar announced its support for a wirelessly-charged taxi project in Oslo, Norway. Jaguar will give 25 I-Pace vehicles to taxi company Cabonline, which will use the vehicles to test the charging infrastructure on taxis in the Norwegian capital. Ralf Speth, Jaguar Land Rover’s chief executive said "The taxi industry is the ideal test bed for wireless charging, and indeed for high-mileage electric mobility across the board".

References

External links

I-Pace
Cars introduced in 2018
2020s cars
Compact sport utility vehicles
Luxury crossover sport utility vehicles
All-wheel-drive vehicles
Euro NCAP executive cars
Production electric cars